Route 191 is a state highway in northern Connecticut, running from East Windsor to Enfield.

Route description

Route 191 begins as Phelps Road at an intersection with US 5 in the town of East Windsor. It heads east through the village of Scantic, turning onto Scantic Road. It continues across the Scantic River, then northeast along the river following Mill Street to the village of Broad Brook, where it then turns northward along Main Street. Route 140 joins Main Street from the west about  later, then after overlapping Route 140 into the village of Melrose, Route 191 continues north along Broad Brook Road into the town of Enfield. Route 191 runs for another three miles (5 km) in eastern Enfield until it ends at an intersection with Route 190 in the village of Scitico.

History
The Melrose to Scitico route was designated as a state highway in 1922 and was known as Highway 208. In 1932, old Highway 208 was renumbered to Route 191, running from Route 140 in Melrose to the current northern terminus in Scitico. In 1941, it was extended west along the current route of Route 140 to US 5 in Warehouse Point. In 1962, as part of a series of realignments triggered by the opening of the Bradley Airport Connector, the western section of Route 140 and the southern section of Route 191 were exchanged. At the same time, Route 191 was extended north to the Massachusetts state line along Taylor Road and modern Route 220. However, this northern extension was reversed by the following year.

Junction list

References

External links

191
Transportation in Hartford County, Connecticut